The Michigan Mathematical Journal (established 1952) is published by the mathematics department at the University of Michigan.  An important early editor for the Journal was George Piranian.

Historically, the Journal has been published a small number of times in a given year (currently four), in all areas of mathematics.  The current Managing Editor is Mircea Mustaţă.

References

External links

Mathematics journals
University of Michigan
1952 establishments in Michigan
Publications established in 1952